Cv Frontin (V-32)  was the fourth ship of the  of the Brazilian Navy.

Construction and career
The ship was built at Naval Arsenal Rio de Janeiro in Rio de Janeiro and was launched on 6 February 1992 and commissioned on 11 March 1994.

She was decommissioned on 23 September 2015.

On 12 April 2016, the former Frontin was sunk as a target ship during a training exercise.

Gallery

References

External links

Ships built in Brazil
Inhaúma-class corvettes
1992 ships